Cameron Clayton, better known by the stage name Farrah Moan, (born September 11, 1993), is an American drag queen, model, actor, make-up artist and internet personality best known for participating in the ninth season of the reality TV show RuPaul's Drag Race, placing eighth, as well as participating in the 4th season of All Stars, where she placed 9th. Her stage name is a pun on the term "pheromone", whilst also being a reference to American actress Farrah Fawcett. In some interviews, Farrah jokingly states that her drag surname is a reference to "being a whore".

Early life 
Farrah graduated from and attended Klein High School in Houston, Texas, in 2011 and was bullied during childhood. Farrah's single-mother household was poor, and he ran away as a teenager, to Austin. He left with a stripper friend, who helped start his career as a drag queen. Prior to starting drag, Clayton was an internet personality on the social-networking website Myspace, under the alias "Cameron Ugh".

Career

Farrah's first major performance was as part of a contest entitled "Austin's Next Drag Superstar", where he was placed as a runner-up. Whilst working in Austin, fellow Drag Race contestant Cynthia Lee Fontaine was supportive of Clayton, and helped him get booked at local venues. Clayton has stated that his biggest inspirations in drag are Christina Aguilera and RuPaul. On February 2, 2017, Logo TV announced that Clayton would participate as a contestant in the ninth season of American reality competition RuPaul's Drag Race. The season premiered on March 24, 2017. Following his poor performance in a roast of the show's judge Michelle Visage, he lost a lip-sync showdown against fellow contestant Alexis Michelle and was eliminated from the competition in 8th place.

Moan was referenced in the first episode of season ten of drag race, with RuPaul misleading the queens into thinking she comes back, to reveal Christina Aguilera, one of her idols, instead. Moan was brought in by the shows producers to meet Aguilera for a Drag Race bonus clip.

In September 2018, Moan performed as a background dancer behind Aguilera for Opening Ceremony's Spring 2019 collection, with other Drag Race alumni.

Farrah photographed with Shea Couleé for Manny MUA's Lunar Beauty palette.

On November 9, 2018, it was announced that Farrah will be one of the contestants competing in the upcoming fourth season of RuPaul's Drag Race: All Stars. After narrowly surviving the first episode's variety show, where she was up for elimination together with Jasmine Masters, Farrah was eliminated by Valentina in the second episode. She returned in episode 6 for a chance to compete again, but lost a lip sync to Valentina, being once again eliminated by her. She placed 9th overall. She appeared as a guest for the first challenge in the premiere of season 11 of Drag Race.

Farrah Moan had a cameo appearance in Men.com's scene Girls Night Part 3.

Personal life

Currently, Clayton resides and works in Los Angeles, California.

In 2018, Clayton and fellow season 9 contestant Shea Couleé were involved in a verbal altercation with a woman at a kebab shop in Newcastle upon Tyne after she began directing homophobic slurs at the pair.

Filmography

Television

Music videos

Web series

References

External links
 
 
 

Living people
1993 births
Male actors from Houston
Male actors from Texas
Farrah Moan
Farrah Moan
Klein High School alumni
LGBT people from Texas